The 24th National Geographic Bee was held in Washington, D.C. on May 24, 2012, sponsored by the National Geographic Society.

Fourteen-year-old Rahul Nagvekar, from Sugar Land, Texas won the competition, beating out 52 other competitors representing the 50 U.S. states, Pacific territories, and Department of Defense dependent schools.

2012 state representatives

References

2012 in Washington, D.C.
2012 in education
National Geographic Bee